Alessandro Abbio (born 13 March 1971 in Racconigi, Province of Cuneo) is an Italian former professional basketball player.

Professional career
Abbio was the MVP of the Italian SuperCup in 1998, and he also won the Euroleague twice; in 1997–98 and 2000–01, with Virtus Bologna.

Italian national team
Abbio competed with Italy at the 1998 FIBA World Championship and at the 2000 Summer Olympic Games.

References

 

1971 births
Living people
Auxilium Pallacanestro Torino players
Basketball players at the 2000 Summer Olympics
CB Granada players
Italian men's basketball players
Italian expatriate basketball people in Spain
Lega Basket Serie A players
Liga ACB players
Olympic basketball players of Italy
People from Racconigi
Valencia Basket players
Virtus Bologna players
1998 FIBA World Championship players
Shooting guards
Goodwill Games medalists in basketball
Competitors at the 1994 Goodwill Games
Sportspeople from the Province of Cuneo